Théâtre du Rêve Expérimental (薪传实验剧团) is a Beijing-based performance group. It is dedicated to produce avant-garde performance. Its founder and artistic director is Wang Chong (王翀), an award-winning director and translator. He has studied and worked with directors Lin Zhaohua and Robert Wilson.

Since its founding, Théâtre du Rêve Expérimental has mounted 17 shows and has performed in China, Hong Kong, Taiwan, Japan, South Korea, U.S., Canada, U.K., the Netherlands and France. It is one of the most active touring companies from China and the youngest Chinese theatre group to tour internationally.

The Warfare of Landmine 2.0 won 2013 Festival/Tokyo Award.

Style
The group does not limit its style to Eastern or Western theatre. Multi-media, performance art, and the harsh reality of Chinese society emerge on the stage altogether, creating a unique experience for the spectators.

Productions

See also
Wang Chong

External links 
theatreRE.com Official site
Press Coverage

References

Theatre companies in Beijing
Theatre production companies
Postmodern theatre